Committee for State Security of the Azerbaijan Soviet Socialist Republic (Russian: Комитет государственной безопасности Азербайджанская ССР) or KGB of the AzSSR was the security agency of the Azerbaijan Soviet Socialist Republic, being the local branch of Committee for State Security of the USSR. Its headquarters was on Narimanov Avenue in Baku, capital of the Azerbaijan SSR.

History 
The KGB in Azerbaijan was founded in 1954 and would eventually be succeeded by the State Security Service of the Republic of Azerbaijan (Dövlət Təhlükəsizlik Komitəsi) in 2015. By the decision of the Supreme Soviet of the Republic of Azerbaijan, the Ministry of National Security was established on the basis of the State Security Committee on 1 November 1991.

Activities 
One of the spheres of activity in the KGB was against the separatist activity of Armenians, including attempts to annex the Nakhichevan Autonomous Soviet Socialist Republic and the Nagorno-Karabakh Autonomous Oblast to the Armenian SSR. These activities specifically targeted the Armenian Revolutionary Federation. In the late 1980s, the main tasks of the KGB of the Azerbaijan SSR were to prevent the subversive activities of neighboring states against Azerbaijan The KGB played a major role in the 1989 Baku pogrom and the Black January events. Late at night on 19 January 1990, after the special forces of the KGB took part in the demolition of the central television station and termination of phone and radio lines, making way for the Soviet Army to enter Baku. During the events, ethnic Azerbaijanis were fired or sent to other regions under various pretexts.

Chairmen of the KGB of AzSSR

References 

Azerbaijan Soviet Socialist Republic
KGB